Isabella Lake is a lake in Alberta, Canada.

Isabella Lake has the name of the sister of C. S. Thompson.

See also
List of lakes of Alberta

References

Lakes of Alberta